The Iglesia San Ramón Nonato, in some sources also referred to as Iglesia San Juan Bautista y San Ramón Nonato, is a Roman Catholic parish church in the town plaza of Juana Díaz, Puerto Rico.

History
The parish was erected in 1798. The Baroque church building was built of plastered masonry starting in 1807 and underwent significant repairs over the years, including after the 1867 earthquake and during a 1970 project that included removal and replacement of the original roof. Nevertheless, the building retains most of its original design, construction, and materials, including masonry walls, towers, sacristies, interior arcades, dome, and wooden spiral stairway in the south tower. The church's placement in the town plaza and close to the town hall reflect the Crown-mandated urban design principles of the early 19th century. Important artworks in the church include wooden carvings of Saint John and the Sorrowful Mother, as well as a painting of the Crucifixion that may be the work of José Campeche.

The church building was entered on the U.S. National Register of Historic Places in 1984.

See also
National Register of Historic Places listings in Juana Díaz, Puerto Rico
Roman Catholic Diocese of Ponce

Notes

References

External links
Summary sheet from the Puerto Rico State Historic Preservation Office 

, National Register of Historic Places cover documentation

Churches on the National Register of Historic Places in Puerto Rico
Juana Díaz, Puerto Rico
1798 establishments in Puerto Rico
Roman Catholic churches completed in 1807
19th-century Roman Catholic church buildings in the United States
Spanish Colonial architecture in Puerto Rico
Baroque Revival architecture in the United States